Andrew Jenks (born March 5, 1986) is an American filmmaker.

Early life
When he was nine, his family moved to Belgium for two years.  
Jenks attended Hendrick Hudson High School in Montrose, New York. When Jenks was 16 he founded the Hendrick Hudson Film Festival, featuring James Earl Jones as its keynote speaker.

His father is Bruce Jenks, Assistant Secretary General for the United Nations. His mother is Nancy Piper Jenks, a family nurse practitioner who is site director in internal medicine at Hudson River HealthCare in Peekskill, NY.

Jenks attended New York University Tisch School of the Arts before dropping out after his sophomore year.

Andrew Jenks, Room 335
At 19 years old, Jenks moved into an assisted living facility, starring, directing, and producing the feature film Andrew Jenks, Room 335. While a sophomore at New York University, HBO bought the rights to the film and released the documentary on January 15, 2008.  The film premiered in Australia and Europe.  The film received mostly positive reviews, Variety calling it 'a lovely and genuine account of generational understanding'.
Andrew Jenks, Room 335 is an example of  a participatory documentary. Jenks' connection to his subjects makes an impact on him as well as them.

The Zen of Bobby V
When he was 21 years old, ESPN Films financed Andrew's second film, The Zen of Bobby V. The film received good reviews after premiering at the TriBeca Film Festival.

Jenks said of the pitch process 'It was me and my two friends – 21 years old, telling ESPN, the 'Worldwide Leader in Sports' that this was a story that had to be told -that it was their duty. I think we left every meeting unsure if we were acting our age, or just showcasing our passion'. Due to a dispute between ESPN and the Nippon Professional Baseball Organization over rights of baseball footage the film was removed from United States availability until 2020.

Acclaim as a young director
At the International Documentary Film Festival at Amsterdam, Jenks was widely acclaimed as one of the next great American filmmakers, and compared to filmmaker Woody Allen.

In a review for Jenks' first film, The New York Post said "It's almost impossible to believe that a kid could produce a documentary like this. It's a gorgeous, hilarious, sad, wonderful, unblinking look at the joy of life – even at the end of it...Bravo Andrew Jenks. Brilliant."

World of Jenks
In January 2010, MTV signed Jenks to do a documentary-series titled World of Jenks. Jenks claimed his inspiration behind World of Jenks was that "I [Andrew] also want to tell the stories of my generation. I want to be a filmmaker that is able to capture what my generation thinks, how they act and what they ultimately stand for." In each episode, Andrew will move in with a new stranger to experience a week in their life, from random people, such as a homeless woman, a man with autism, a rapper, MMA fighter, a professional poker player, an NFL cheerleader, a female-fronted band, etc. The series premiered September 12, 2010, on MTV. Kid Cudi allowed this show to use his song 'Soundtrack 2 My Life' as its theme song.

Season 2 of "World of Jenks" expanded to hour long episodes and continued to be a ratings hit. MSN remarked, "'Jenks – like Chad, Kaylin and D-Real – has overcome the odds and consistently triumphed in its timeslot."

The award-winning show was dubbed as a show unlike any other on MTV. U.S. News & World Report said, "The only way to understand someone else's life is to live it. That's the premise behind documentary filmmaker Andrew Jenks's World of Jenks... The result: a raw, intimate look at daily struggles and victories, and what it means to be a young person today." USA Today said, "MTV's World of Jenks is one of the few unscripted shows that's actually snark-free and helpful to people ... I do like how this series gives a voice to all kinds of teens, not just the pretty ones in fashionable clothes."

Jenks was the face MTV's 2012 election coverage, both producing and hosting. He interviewed or asked questions to nearly all of the candidates, including Governor Mitt Romney and President Barack Obama.

Jenks left the show after 3 years because of a new film about Ryan Ferguson.

It's About a Girl
Jenks is the creator of It's About a Girl, a magic realism YouTube web series premiered July 9, 2013. He plays a man who pursues the girl of his dreams, played by Taryn Southern. Tubefilter praised the series for seeking a connection between dreams and reality and preferring symbolism and emotions over dialogue.

Posterized
In May 2014, ESPN released the 30 for 30 short "Posterized", a look into former NBA center Shawn Bradley. Bradley is mostly remembered for two things—being one of the tallest players to ever play in the NBA and for being on the wrong end of a lot of great dunks. Through interviews with Jeff Van Gundy and Shawn Bradley, the film shows the media attention he gained while a player and then focuses on Bradley's life after basketball.

In 2014, ESPN Films' 30 for 30 Shorts series took home an Emmy for Outstanding Short-Format Nonfiction Program.

Activism 
Jenks had advocated on behalf of prisoners wrongfully incarcerated. In 2011, he called for the release of Ryan Ferguson. He later advocated for the release of Kalvin Michael Smith who was released after 20 years in prison.

Jenks has teamed up with DKMS and DoSomething to promote teens and college students to join the bone marrow donor registry. He will be participating in college speaking tours where he will try to raise awareness and involvement. He also did a PSA for Do Something with a five-year-old leukemia patient about the importance of "getting swabbed".

It's Not Over
Jenks directed a feature-length documentary titled "It's Not Over", an inspiring story of three courageous millennials from around the world who are living with or affected by HIV/AIDS. Jenks takes viewers on a journey across India, South Africa and the United States to experience the epidemic first hand. The result is a deeply personal and uplifting story that is rarely represented in popular culture.

Rihanna took part in the production and press for the film.

It's Not Over was made possible by the M·A·C AIDS Fund and is available on Netflix, SnagFilms, Hulu and Pivot (where available).

All American Family
In 2015, CNN Films released "All American Family", a short film Jenks' company produced and he directed. The film chronicles an all-Deaf high school championship football team. The film premiered at the Tribeca Film Festival and Los Angeles Film Festival and won Best Short Film at the Hamptons International Film Festival. Rich Eisen said the film was, "Friday Night Lights" like I haven't seen before." The deaf community lauded the film for capturing an accurate perspective of their life.

dream/killer 

Jenks premiered his latest feature documentary titled dream/killer at the 2015 Tribeca Film Festival, his most acclaimed film since ROOM 335. The New York Times said the film "elicits  incredulity, frustration and astonishment...fast-paced and frightening.", the Village Voice calling it a "Must-See Wrongful-Conviction Doc 'dream/killer' Indicts a System.", and Rolling Stone saying, "Fans of Serial and The Jinx, meet your new favorite film."
While in production, Jenks made head waves in the legal community after filming Ryan Ferguson in prison giving a plea straight to camera. After nearly 10 years, Ferguson's conviction was vacated. Jenks however indicated, the film is bittersweet, "I wanted to make sure that people knew this was not going to be a happy ending. Because it isn't."

In 2016, Jenks co-created and executive produced the MTV Series, "Unlocking the Truth". The docu-series followed Ryan Ferguson as he investigated three cases believed to have resulted in wrongful convictions. It is believed that the series led to the release of Kalvin Michael Smith. Jenks noted that, "This show starts and ends with Ryan Ferguson. He is a natural leader, a guy with zero self-pity for what he has been put through and instead has a unique instinct to wake up every morning and help others."

Fictional Work 
In 2015, Jenks sold a spec script to ABC Studios, titled "Sam". He said after covering the 2012 election for MTV, he believed "education would prove to be America's greatest weakness. It will catch up with us. And this is coming from me, certainly no genius. I haven't even graduated college". "Sam" follows a quirky teacher kicked out of several public high schools for eccentric teaching methods, left with one last chance to teach with his best friend at an elite private school in New York City. ABC Family developed the script and passed on the project after the pilot stage.
 
Jenks sold and developed a half hour comedy titled "The Motivational Speaker" to HBO in 2016. The project remains in development with HBO and Pretty Matches, the Sarah Jessica Parker production company.

Podcasts
In 2019, Jenks began hosting the podcast Gangster Capitalism, the first C13Originals podcast produced by Cadence13. Season one was nominated for a Peabody Award and optioned as a TV series.

What Really Happened?
In October 2017, Jenks debuted as writer and narrator of the documentary podcast What Really Happened from Seven Bucks Productions, with executive producers Dwayne Johnson and Dany Garcia. The podcast is described as a rogue investigation into pop culture history.

The podcast reached #1 on the international Apple Podcast charts and is now in its third season.

All-American High School Film Festival

Jenks founded the all All-American High School Film Festival. The annual event is held at the AMC Theatres in Times Square, New York City, the largest movie theater in the United States. The festival has given over $1,00,000 in scholarships and prizes, hosted over 30 universities for the largest arts college fair in the country, and partnered with AT&T for an anti-bullying initiative. The festival was inspired after 10 years of Jenks' high school film festival. The 2021 festival had over 2,000 submissions from over 30 countries with judges such as Kristen Stewart, John Oliver, and James Earl Jones.

Personal life
In 2015, E! News reported that Jenks was dating actress  Brittany Snow. 

On his podcast, What Really Happened?, produced by Dwayne Johnson, Andrew revealed he "battles chronic depression everyday", adding in an interview with Dr. Barbara Van Dahlen that he prefers to call it Dysthymia. He said that while at MTV he was embarrassed by the disorder and had turned down an offer to speak at the 2013 National Conference on Mental Health at the White House. Andrew said it was one of his biggest regrets of his career. 

He is considered an example of a high-functioning person with a diagnosis of Major depressive disorder.

In 2014, he received an honorary doctorate from Quinnipiac University.

References

1986 births
Film directors from New York City
Living people
People with mood disorders